9 Elefants is an iOS puzzle game developed by Microïds and published by Anuman. It was released on April 24, 2014.

Critical reception
The game has a rating of 40% on Metacritic based on 4 critic reviews.

Arcade Sushi wrote " Since 9 Elefants is $2.99 to download, I expected a bit more of an addictive experience. Instead, I solved a few puzzles, checked out a few pretty pictures of Paris and had a decent enough time. For a free to play title, that's all fine and dandy. But when money is involved, the puzzles take on an entirely different meaning. " Pocket Gamer UK said " A game this beautiful deserves a lot more than the rambling plot and uninspired gameplay that brings it to an almost immediate halt. " Adventure Gamers wrote " 9 Elefants effortlessly copies what should have been a successful formula on paper, but a lack of puzzle variety and story relevance causes most redeeming qualities to get lost in translation." MacLife said " They say an elephant never forgets. We doubt we'll forget our experience with 9 Elefants, although not for the right reasons."

References

IOS games
IOS-only games
2014 video games
Microïds games
Puzzle video games
Video games developed in France